The ASEAN Football Federation (AFF) is an organisation within the Asian Football Confederation (AFC) and is an international governing body of association football, futsal, and beach soccer in Southeast Asia. It consists of the federations of Australia, Brunei, Cambodia, East Timor, Indonesia, Laos, Malaysia, Myanmar, Philippines, Singapore, Thailand, and Vietnam.

Despite using "ASEAN" in its name, the AFF is not affiliated with the Association of Southeast Asian Nations.

History 
AFF was founded on 31 January 1984 by the meeting in Jakarta of 6 founding member are Brunei Darussalam, Indonesia, Malaysia, Singapore, Philippines and Thailand. The idea of founding the federation came from the initial meeting of founding the sub-continental football association in Bangkok in 1982 that was attended by Hamzah Abu Samah, Peter Velappan, Hans Pandelaki, Fernando G. Alvarez, Pisit Ngampanich, Teo Chong Tee and Yap Boon Chuan. Other nations that have joined the federation since have been Cambodia, Laos, Myanmar and Vietnam (all in 1996), East Timor in 2004, and Australia in 2013.

President

Members 
It has 12 member associations, all of whom are members of the Asian Football Confederation. 

(*) Founding member

Tournaments

National team
AFF Championship
AFF U-23 Championship
AFF U-19 Youth Championship
AFF U-16 Youth Championship
AFF Women's Championship
AFF U-19 Women's Championship
AFF U-16 Women's Championship
AFF Futsal Championship
AFF Beach Soccer Championship

Club
ASEAN Club Championship
ASEAN Super League (proposed)
AFF Futsal Cup
AFF Women's Futsal Cup

The Mekong Club Championship started in the 2014 season and includes the champions from 5 of the 6 countries through which the Mekong river flows (Cambodia, Laos, Myanmar, Thailand and Vietnam). The ASEAN Club Championship has stopped rolling since 2005.

Current title holders

Titles by nation 

Note: (*) Champion as invitation teams.

Rankings

National football team
AFF Men's National Football Team Ranking by FIFAUpdate: 22 December 2022

Top Ranked Men's National Football Teams

Women's national football team
AFF Women's National Football Team Ranking by FIFAUpdate: 13 October 2022

* Inactive for more than 48 months and therefore not ranked.

Top Ranked Women's National Football Teams

National futsal team
AFF Men's National Futsal Team Ranking by Futsal World RankingUpdate: October 2022

Note: (*) Inactive

Women's national futsal team
AFF Women's National Futsal Team Ranking by The Roon BaUpdate: January 2022 

Note: (*) Inactive

National beach soccer team
AFF Men's National Beach Soccer Team Ranking by BSWWUpdate: December 2021

Women's national beach soccer team
AFF Women's National Beach Soccer Team Ranking by BSWWUpdate: December 2021

National football league 

AFF Men's National Football League Ranking by AFC

AFC Club Compilations Ranking 2022 footyrankings/

Update: 24 December 2022

Awards 
AFF President Sultan of Pahang, Sultan Haji Ahmad Shah said that:

Sultan Haji Ahmad Shah, who is also chairman of the Awards Selection Committee, said that as football in the region continued to develop and mature, the commitment demonstrated by ASEAN’s finest needed to be acknowledged.

The AFF Awards is held every 2 years, starting from 2013.

ASEAN Goodwill Award

AFF Life Service Award

AFF Association of the Year

AFF National Team of the Year

AFF Player of the Year (men's)

AFF Player of the Year (women's)

AFF Youth Player of the Year (men's)

AFF Futsal Team of the Year

AFF Futsal Player of the Year (men's)

AFF Coach of the Year

AFF Referee of the Year

AFF Assistant Referee of the Year

Best Goal in the AFF Suzuki Cup

AFF Best XI

References

External links